Graham Killeen (born 1980) is an American independent filmmaker. He is best known as the writer-director of Six Bullets, a short film that premiered at the NYC Downtown Film Festival in 2007.  He won the Shepherd Express Best of Milwaukee 2006 award for "Best Milwaukee Filmmaker".  Currently he is working on a feature-length drama titled 355 for the film company Signal Fire Films.

Killeen was raised in Newburg and West Bend, Wisconsin. He holds a bachelor's degree in Theatre Arts from the University of Wisconsin–Milwaukee, having graduated in 2007.  Killeen is a film critic for the Milwaukee Journal-Sentinel.

References

 Milwaukee Journal Sentinel, 2004-11-17 Shepherd Express (2006)
 Signal Fire Films, LLC Shepherd Express (checked 2007-06-03)
 Milwaukee Journal Sentinel (2007-04-19)
 Graham Killeen, Wending wicked way to laughs

Related links

1980 births
Living people
University of Wisconsin–Milwaukee alumni
American film directors
Milwaukee Journal Sentinel people
People from Newburg, Wisconsin
People from West Bend, Wisconsin